Santha is a 2007 Indian Kannada-language crime film directed by S. Muralimohan, who also penned the dialogues and screenplay for a story by Ajay Kumar. The film stars Shiva Rajkumar, Aarti Chhabria and Sridevika in the lead roles. The film's theme was similar to the 1995 Shivarajkumar starrer Om for which Muralimohan worked as an associate director. Gurukiran scored and composed the film's soundtrack. Although the film was released on 18 May 2007 to negative reviews, the film had a large opening and turned out to be a commercially safe venture.

Cast 
 Shiva Rajkumar
 Aarti Chabria
 Sridevika
 Sangliyana
 Komal Kumar
 Hema Chaudhary

Soundtrack

Tracks 
 "Superman Spiderman Pokémon" -
 "Bhagyavantha Kai Kotta" -
 "Dhava Dhava Dhava" -
 "Naguvirali Sukavirali" -
 "Naguvirali Sukavirali" (female) - 
 "Heart Anno Adda" -

References

External links 
Filmibeat review
Nowrunning review
Chitraloka review
Indian gangster films
2000s Kannada-language films
Indian crime action films
2007 films
2000s crime action films